Olivella costulata is a species of small sea snail, marine gastropod mollusk in the subfamily Olivellinae, in the family Olividae, the olives.  Species in the genus Olivella are commonly called dwarf olives.

Description
Members of the order Neogastropoda are mostly gonochoric and broadcast spawners. Their embryos develop into planktonic trocophore larvae and later into juvenile veligers before becoming fully grown adults.

The length of the shell attains 2.68 mm.

Distribution
This marine species occurs off Martinique.

References

 Paulmier G. (2015). Les Olivellidae (Neogastropoda) des Antilles françaises. Description de quatre nouvelles espèces. Xenophora Taxonomy. 8: 3-23

costulata
Gastropods described in 2007